For the Stars is a 2001 album by classically trained Swedish mezzo-soprano Anne Sofie von Otter and Elvis Costello.

Track listing
 "No Wonder" (3:37) (Elvis Costello)
 "Baby Plays Around" (3:13) (Cait O'Riordan, Declan MacManus)
 "Go Leave" (2:50) (Kate McGarrigle)
 "Rope" (3:57) (Elvis Costello, Fleshquartet)
 "Don't Talk (Put Your Head on My Shoulder)" (3:12) (Brian Wilson, Tony Asher)
 "Broken Bicycles/Junk" (4:06) (Tom Waits/Paul McCartney)
 "The Other Woman" (3:36) (Jessie Mae Robinson)
 "Like an Angel Passing Through My Room" (5:03) (Benny Andersson, Björn Ulvaeus)
 "Green Song" (4:38) (Elvis Costello, Svante Henryson)
 "April After All" (2:52) (Ron Sexsmith)
 "You Still Believe in Me" (3:09) (Brian Wilson, Tony Asher)
 "I Want to Vanish" (2:41) (Elvis Costello)
 "For No One" (2:00) (John Lennon, Paul McCartney)
 "Shamed Into Love" (3:47) (Declan MacManus, Rubén Blades)
 "Just a Curio" (4:18) (Elvis Costello, Fleshquartet)
 "This House Is Empty Now" (4:39) (Burt Bacharach, Elvis Costello)
 "Take It With Me" (3:17) (Kathleen Brennan, Tom Waits)
 "For the Stars" (2:46) (Elvis Costello)

Personnel
Elvis Costello – vocals, baritone guitar, Lowrey organ, bass
Anne Sofie von Otter – vocals
Bengt Forsberg – piano, Hammond B-3 organ
Billy Bremner
Michael Blair – vibraphone, bass drum, percussion
Bebe Risenfors – clarinet, tenor saxophone, accordion
Svante Henryson – celtar, cello, upright bass
Mats Schubert – piano, harmonium, Moog bass
Steve Nieve – piano, celeste, organ

Charts

References

Anne Sofie von Otter albums
Elvis Costello albums
2001 albums
Collaborative albums
Covers albums